Tania Singfield (born 2 September 1970) is a Canadian soccer player who played as a goalkeeper for the Canada women's national soccer team from 1990 to 1997. She was part of the team at the 1995 FIFA Women's World Cup.

Playing career
 Canadian National Team 1990-1997
 World Cup Team / Sweden 1995
 Canada Games Team / Quebec 1993
 World University Team 1993
 Chicago Raptors / W-League 1995
 Ottawa Fury / W-League 2000-2001
 Ottawa University Gee Gees / Champions 1996 / Silver 1997
 Nepean United Spirits / Canadian Champs 1998

Coaching career
After she finished playing professionally, Singfield coached other goalkeepers.
She is the Director and Founder of Golden Gloves Academy in Ottawa, ON (Stittsville). She has helped develop players at all levels and has worked with many clubs, including Laguna Hills Eclipse in California, the Canadian National Team, and the National Excel Program (NEX)..

Since 2014, she has been the goalkeeper coach for Canada's U17 national team. She served as goalkeeper coach at the 2016 FIFA U-17 Women's World Cup in Jordan, the 2016 U-17 Four Nations Tour in China, the 2016 U-15 CONCACAF Championship in Orlando, Florida and the 2015 U-15 CONCACAF Championship in Cayman Islands.

References

External links
 
 
 Golden Gloves Academy profile

1970 births
Living people
Canadian women's soccer players
Canada women's international soccer players
People from Outaouais
Soccer people from Quebec
1995 FIFA Women's World Cup players
Women's association football goalkeepers
Ottawa Fury (women) players
USL W-League (1995–2015) players